Elefthérios Eleftheríou (born June 12, 1974 in Larnaca, Cyprus) is a Cypriot football midfielder who played for Alki Larnaca. He also played for Enosis Neon Paralimni and AEK Larnaca.

Honours
AEK Larnaca
 Cypriot Cup: 2003–04

References

External links
 

Living people
1974 births
Cypriot footballers
Cyprus international footballers
Association football midfielders
AEK Larnaca FC players
Enosis Neon Paralimni FC players
Ethnikos Achna FC players
Alki Larnaca FC players